Worst Friends may refer to:

Worst Friends (2009 film), a 2009 Korean film
Worst Friends (2014 film), a 2014 American film